Urheilulehti is a popular weekly Finnish sports magazine. It is the second oldest sports journal in the World (after Italian La Gazzetta dello Sport).

History and profile
Urheilulehti was founded by Ivar Wilskman in January 1898. The magazine is published by A-lehdet Oy weekly on Thursdays. Its headquarters is in Helsinki.

The current editor-in-chief of Urheilulehti is Jukka Rönkä. The Sports Library has all issues of the magazine. 

In 2013 Urheilulehti  had a circulation of 31,453 copies.

See also
 List of magazines in Finland

References

External links
 

1898 establishments in Finland
Magazines established in 1898
Magazines published in Helsinki
Sports magazines
Weekly magazines published in Finland